Charles Frank Bolden Jr. (born August 19, 1946) is a former Administrator of NASA, a retired United States Marine Corps Major General, and a former astronaut who flew on four Space Shuttle missions.

He graduated from the United States Naval Academy with the class of 1968. Bolden became a Marine aviator and test pilot. After his service as an astronaut, he became Deputy Commandant of Midshipmen at the Naval Academy.

On May 23, 2009, President Barack Obama announced the nomination of Bolden as Administrator of NASA and Lori Garver as deputy NASA administrator. Both were confirmed by the Senate by unanimous consent on July 15, 2009. Bolden was the first African American to head the agency on a permanent basis.

On January 12, 2017, Bolden announced his retirement from NASA during a town hall meeting at NASA Headquarters in Washington D.C. His last day would be January 19, and Robert M. Lightfoot Jr. was announced as acting NASA Administrator.

In 2020, Bolden was elected a member of the National Academy of Engineering for leadership and development of U.S. human spaceflight and space operations programs, and for revitalizing fundamental aeronautics research.

Education 
Bolden graduated from C. A. Johnson High School in Columbia, South Carolina, in 1964. He earned a Bachelor of Science degree in Electrical Science from the United States Naval Academy in 1968, where he was a contemporary of future Marine officers Oliver North, Jim Webb and Michael Hagee and future Chairman of the Joint Chiefs of Staff Michael Mullen, and Admirals Dennis C. Blair, and Jay L. Johnson, and later earned a Master of Science degree in Systems Management from the University of Southern California in 1977. He is a member of Omega Psi Phi fraternity.

Military career 
In high school Bolden was turned down for an appointment to the United States Naval Academy by South Carolina's Congressional delegation, which included then segregationist Senator Strom Thurmond. Bolden received his appointment after personally writing, as a high school senior, to President Lyndon B. Johnson. A recruiter came to his house a few weeks later, eventually leading to Bolden receiving an appointment from U.S. Representative William L. Dawson from Chicago, Illinois. He later received notes of congratulations from Thurmond at various career milestones.

Bolden was commissioned a second lieutenant in the United States Marine Corps (USMC) following graduation from the United States Naval Academy in 1968. He was president of his class. He underwent flight training at Pensacola, Florida, Meridian, Mississippi, and Kingsville, Texas, before being designated a United States Naval Aviator in May 1970.

He flew more than 100 sorties into North and South Vietnam, Laos, and Cambodia in the A-6A Intruder while assigned to VMA(AW)-533 at Royal Thai Air Base Nam Phong, Thailand, from June 1972 to June 1973. Upon returning to the United States, Bolden began a two-year tour as a Marine Corps officer selection and recruiting officer in Los Angeles, California, followed by three years in various assignments at Marine Corps Air Station El Toro, California.

In June 1979, he graduated from the United States Naval Test Pilot School at Naval Air Station Patuxent River, Maryland and was assigned to the Naval Air Test Center's Systems Engineering and Strike Aircraft Test Directorates. While there, he served as an ordnance test pilot and flew numerous test projects in the A-6E, EA-6B, and A-7C/E airplanes. He logged more than 6,000 hours flying time.

Bolden was selected as an astronaut candidate by NASA in 1980. He was a member of the NASA Astronaut Corps until 1994 when he returned to assignments in the Marine Corps, first as the Deputy Commandant of Midshipmen at the Naval Academy, effective June 27, 1994. In July 1997, he was assigned as the Deputy Commanding General of I Marine Expeditionary Force. From February to June 1998, he served as Commanding General, I MEF (Forward) in support of Operation Desert Thunder in Kuwait. In July 1998, he was promoted to his final rank of major general and assumed his duties as the Deputy Commander, United States Forces Japan. He then served as the Commanding General, 3rd Marine Aircraft Wing, from August 9, 2000, until August 2002. He retired from the military in August 2004.

NASA career 
Selected by NASA in May 1980, Bolden became an astronaut in August 1981. He was one of several astronauts recruited by Nichelle Nichols as part of a NASA effort to increase the number of minority and female astronauts. His technical assignments included: Astronaut Office Safety Officer; Technical Assistant to the Director of Flight Crew Operations; Special Assistant to the Director of the Johnson Space Center; Astronaut Office Liaison to the Safety, Reliability and Quality Assurance Directorates of the Marshall Space Flight Center (MSFC) and the Kennedy Space Center (KSC); Chief of the Safety Division at JSC; Lead Astronaut for Vehicle Test and Checkout at the Kennedy Space Center; and Assistant Deputy Administrator, NASA Headquarters.

A veteran of four space flights, he has logged over 680 hours in space. Bolden served as pilot on STS-61-C (January 12–18, 1986) and STS-31 (April 24–29, 1990), and was the mission commander on STS-45 (March 24April 2, 1992), and STS-60 (February 3–11, 1994).

Bolden was the first person to ride the Launch Complex 39 slidewire baskets which enable rapid escape from a Space Shuttle on the launch pad. The need for a human test was determined following a launch abort on STS-41-D where controllers were afraid to order the crew to use the untested escape system.

A few years before his appointment by President Barack Obama to be administrator of NASA, Bolden auditioned, along with professional actors, for the role of virtual host for NASA's "Shuttle Launch Experience" educational attraction at the Kennedy Space Center Visitor Complex in Merritt Island, Florida.

Spaceflights 

On STS-61-C, Bolden piloted . During the six-day flight, crew members deployed the SATCOM Ku-band satellite and conducted experiments in astrophysics and materials processing. The mission launched from Kennedy Space Center on January 12, 1986, orbited the Earth 96 times, and ended with a successful night landing at Edwards Air Force Base, California on January 18, 1986.

Bolden piloted  during STS-31. Launched on April 24, 1990, from Kennedy Space Center, the crew spent the five-day mission deploying the Hubble Space Telescope and conducting a variety of mid-deck experiments. They also used a variety of cameras, including both the IMAX in cabin and cargo bay cameras, for Earth observations from their record-setting altitude of over 400 miles. Following 75 orbits of Earth in 121 hours, Discovery landed at Edwards Air Force Base on April 29, 1990.

On STS-45, Bolden commanded a crew of seven aboard , launched on March 24, 1992, from Kennedy Space Center. STS-45 was the first Spacelab mission dedicated to NASA's "Mission to Planet Earth". During the nine-day mission, the crew operated the twelve experiments that constituted the ATLAS-1 (Atmospheric Laboratory for Applications and Science) cargo. ATLAS-1 obtained detailed measurements of atmospheric chemical and physical properties. In addition, this was the first time an artificial beam of electrons was used to stimulate an auroral discharge. Following 143 orbits of Earth, Atlantis landed at Kennedy Space Center on April 2, 1992.

Bolden commanded STS-60's crew of six aboard Discovery. This was the historic first joint-American–Russian Space Shuttle mission involving the participation of a Russian cosmonaut, Sergei Krikalev, as a mission specialist. The flight launched on February 3, 1994, from Kennedy Space Center, and carried the Space Habitation Module-2 (SPACEHAB-2), and the Wake Shield Facility. The crew conducted a series of joint American/Russian science activities. The mission achieved 130 orbits of the Earth, ending with a landing on February 11, 1994, at the Kennedy Space Center.

Administrator of NASA 

In 2009, President Obama appointed Bolden to be administrator of NASA.

In a NASA video published April 28, 2010, titled "NASA's New Era of Innovation and Discovery", Bolden said, "We're going to turn science fiction into science fact".

On the same day, at a question and answer session with employees at the Johnson Space Center, Bolden compared the Constellation Program to a stillborn baby calf extracted from a camel's womb by U.S. Marines. Bolden said, "We've got some stillborn calves around, and we have got to figure out ways to help each other bring them back to life".

In a June 2010 interview with Al Jazeera, Bolden said that the top three goals he was tasked with by President Obama were to help re-inspire children to want to get into science and math, to expand NASA's international relationships, and, "perhaps foremost", "to reach out to the Muslim world ... to help them feel good about their historic contribution to science... and math and engineering". The White House disagreed with Bolden's statement, with the press secretary saying Bolden probably misspoke and "That was not his task, and that's not the task of NASA".

Bolden said his agency's long-term ambition is landing astronauts on Mars. He has cited spending cuts as a concern for major NASA projects.

On August 28, 2012, he was the first human being to have his voice broadcast on the surface of Mars. Although the rover has no speakers, it received the transmission of his voice and then beamed it back to Earth.

In 2013, he noted the National Aerospace Week as Administrator of NASA.

On October 28, 2015, Bolden presented the next steps for a human journey to Mars at the Center for American Progress in Washington, D.C.

On January 12, 2017, Bolden announced his resignation from NASA during a Town Hall meeting at NASA Headquarters in Washington D.C. His last day would be January 19, and Robert M. Lightfoot Jr. was announced as acting NASA Administrator.

After leaving NASA, Bolden has served on the United Arab Emirates Space Advisory Committee.

Personal life 
Bolden lives in Houston, and is married to Alexis (née Walker); the couple have two children. Bolden is a Christian, stating in a question and answer session in May 2010:

"You know, the universe is a big place. I'm a practicing Christian, so in my faith, I learn about omnipotent, omnipresent God, which means he's everywhere. He's all-knowing. He does everything. And I just cannot bring my little pea brain to believe that a God like that would pick one planet of one of millions of suns and say that's the only place in the vast universe that I'm going to put any kind of life. And so the problem is I haven't been far enough away."

Awards

Honors 
 Honorary Doctor of Science Degree from the University of South Carolina – 1984
 Honorary Doctor of Humane Letters from Winthrop College – 1986
 University of Southern California's Alumni Award of Merit – 1989
 Honorary Doctor of Humane Letters from Johnson C. Smith University – 1990
 Honorary Doctor of Engineering from Rensselaer Polytechnic Institute – 2008
 Honorary Doctor of Laws from Monmouth University – 2011
 Honorary Doctor of Public Service from the University of Maryland University College – 2012
 Honorary Doctor of Engineering from the University of Bristol – 2014
 National Space Trophy – 2014
 Honorary Doctor of Science from Rochester Institute of Technology – 2015
 Honorary Doctor from Bar-Ilan University – 2016
 Nierenberg Prize – 2016
 Inducted into the National Aviation Hall of Fame in 2017
 Honorary Doctor of Science from University of Arizona – 2017
 Carl Sagan Award for Public Appreciation of Science – 2017
International Space Hall of Fame – 1997
 Member of the National Academy of Engineering – 2020
 Honorary Doctor of Humane Letters from Embry-Riddle Aeronautical University – 2022

See also 

 List of African-American astronauts
 List of notable United States Marines

References

External links 

 Official Biography as Administrator
 
 
 Official USMC Biography
 Spacefacts biography of Charles F. Bolden Jr.
 Military Child Education Coalition Board of Directors
 2017 retrospective interview on Bolden's career and leadership of NASA with the Financial Times
 Charlie Bolden on Twitter

1946 births
Administrators of NASA
American astronaut-politicians
United States Marine Corps personnel of the Vietnam War
American test pilots
Aviators from South Carolina
Living people
People from Columbia, South Carolina
Recipients of the Air Medal
Recipients of the Defense Superior Service Medal
Recipients of the Distinguished Flying Cross (United States)
Recipients of the Legion of Merit
Recipients of the NASA Exceptional Service Medal
Recipients of the Gallantry Cross (Vietnam)
United States Astronaut Hall of Fame inductees
United States Marine Corps astronauts
United States Marine Corps generals
United States Naval Academy alumni
United States Naval Aviators
United States Naval Test Pilot School alumni
USC Viterbi School of Engineering alumni
Recipients of the Defense Distinguished Service Medal
African-American Christians
Space Shuttle program astronauts
Obama administration personnel